Kosmos 268 ( meaning Cosmos 268), known before launch as DS-P1-Yu No.18, was a Soviet satellite which was used as a radar calibration target for tests of anti-ballistic missiles. It was a  spacecraft, which was built by the Yuzhnoye Design Bureau, and launched in 1969 as part of the Dnepropetrovsk Sputnik programme.

Launch 
Kosmos 268 was launched from Site 86/4 at Kapustin Yar, atop a Kosmos-2I 63SM carrier rocket. The launch occurred on 5 March 1969 at 13:04:55 UTC, and resulted in Kosmos 268's successful deployment into low Earth orbit. Upon reaching orbit, it was assigned its Kosmos designation, and received the International Designator 1969-020A.

It remained in orbit until it decayed and reentered the atmosphere on 9 May 1970. It was the nineteenth of seventy nine DS-P1-Yu satellites to be launched, and the eighteenth of seventy two to successfully reach orbit.

See also

1969 in spaceflight

References

Spacecraft launched in 1969
Kosmos satellites
Dnepropetrovsk Sputnik program